Perasia is a genus of moths of the family Noctuidae erected by Jacob Hübner in 1823.

Species
Perasia helvina (Guenée, 1852)

References

Catocalinae
Moth genera